Nantlle is a small village in the slate quarrying Nantlle Valley in Gwynedd, Wales. It lies on the north shore of Llyn Nantlle Uchaf and is part of the community of Llanllyfni. The population was 228 in 2011 with 42% born in England.

References

External links

Villages in Gwynedd
Llanllyfni
Dyffryn Nantlle